Gabriele Manfredi (25 March 1681 – 13 October 1761) was an Italian mathematician who undertook important work in the field of calculus.

Early years

Gabriele Manfredi was born in Bologna, then in the Papal States, on 25 March 1681.
He was the son of Alfonso Manfredi, a notary from Lugo, Emilia-Romagna, and Anna Maria Fiorini.  
His elder brother Eustachio studied law, then turned to science.  
Gabriele and his brother Eraclito studied medicine, while his fourth brother Emilio became a Jesuit preacher.  
His two sisters Maddalena  and Teresa were also well educated, and later collaborated with their brothers in their work. Gabriele became uncomfortable with the study of anatomy, and turned to other subjects before he and Eustachio were introduced to the new subject of differential calculus.

Mathematician

Manfredi was one of a group of young men at the University who became interested in the techniques of Cartesian geometry and differential calculus, and who engaged in experiments and astronomical observation. Others were his brother Eustachio, Vittorio Francesco Stancari and Giuseppe Verzaglia.
Of these, Gabriele Manfredi developed the most advanced understanding of mathematics.
Eustachio Manfredi became more interested in astronomy, but Gabriele persisted with mathematics, studying the works of Leibniz and of Johann and Jacob Bernoulli on infinitesimal calculus.

After graduating, Gabriele went to Rome at the end of 1702, where he became librarian to Cardinal Pietro Ottoboni, a historian, antiquarian and astronomer. He helped Ottoboni build a sundial at Santa Maria degli Angeli e dei Martiri and helped in the work of reforming the Gregorian calendar.  He continued to study mathematics, including differential and integral calculus and logarithmic curves. In 1707 he returned to Bologna where he published his best known work on first-order differential equations. 
This was the first European work on differential equations. Despite this, he was not given a senior position in the university.
He made further contributions to the theory of calculus, although his main contribution after 1715 was as a teacher.

Later career

In 1708 Manfredi began working for the Chancellery of the Senate of Bologna, where he rose to the rank of first chancellor and remained until he retired in 1752. From 1720 he also taught at the University of Bologna. In 1742 he was made superintendent of water, replacing his brother Eustachio.  This job, concerned with improving river navigation while avoiding flooding, proved to be difficult and politically controversial.

Manfredi married Teresa Del Sole, from the family of the painter Giovan Giuseppe, and they had three children.
He died in Bologna on 5 October 1761 at the age of 80.
The asteroid 13225 Manfredi was named in honor of him and his two brothers, Eustachio and Eraclito.

Work
In his work  (1707) Manfredi set forth the results he had obtained so far in solving problems related to differential equations and the foundations of calculus.
His paper  (1714) described the procedure commonly adopted for integrating first-order homogeneous differential equations.

List of works

References 
Citations

Sources

1681 births
1761 deaths
Italian mathematicians
Academic staff of the University of Bologna